The men's ISSF 25 meter rapid fire pistol was a shooting sports event held as part of the Shooting at the 1960 Summer Olympics programme. It was the 11th appearance of the event. The competition was held on 8 and 9 September 1960 at the shooting ranges in Rome. 57 shooters from 35 nations competed. Nations had been limited to two shooters each since the 1952 Games. The event was won by William McMillan of the United States, the nation's first victory in the event since 1924 and third overall (most of any nation). Silver went to Pentti Linnosvuo of Finland, similarly taking his nation's first medal since 1924. Aleksandr Zabelin of the Soviet Union earned bronze. The three men had tied for first after the main round of 60 shots and had required a three-way shoot-off to determine the medals.

Background

This was the 11th appearance of what had been standardised in 1948 as the men's ISSF 25 meter rapid fire pistol event, the only event on the 2020 programme that traces back to 1896. The event has been held at every Summer Olympics except 1904 and 1928 (when no shooting events were held) and 1908; it was nominally open to women from 1968 to 1980, although very few women participated these years. There is no women's equivalent on the Olympic programme, as of 2021. The first five events were quite different, with some level of consistency finally beginning with the 1932 event—which, though it had differences from the 1924 competition, was roughly similar. The 1936 competition followed the 1932 one quite closely. The post-World War II event substantially altered the competition once again.

Six of the top 10 shooters from 1956 returned: gold medalist Ștefan Petrescu of Romania, silver medalist Yevgeny Cherkasov of the Soviet Union, fourth-place finisher (and 1952 fifth-place finisher) Pentti Linnosvuo of Finland, fifth-place finisher Oscar Cervo of Argentina, seventh-place finisher Kalle Sievänen of Finland, and tenth-place finisher Carlos Monteverde of Venezuela. Reigning world champion and world record holder Aleksandr Kropotin of the Soviet Union did not compete in Rome; fellow Soviet runner-up (and co-record holder, having lost to Kropotin in a shoot-off) Alexander Zabelin was. Petrescu had finished third at the world championships. William McMillan, who had finished seventh at the 1952 Olympics and second at the 1954 world championships before missing the 1956 Games due to equipment failure at the U.S. trials, also returned.

The Republic of China, India, Morocco, Pakistan, South Korea, Thailand, and the United Arab Republic each made their debut in the event; East and West Germany competed together as the United Team of Germany for the first time. The United States made its ninth appearance in the event, most of any nation.

Competition format

The competition format followed the 1948 format, now very close to the modern rapid fire pistol competition after significant variation before World War II. Each shooter fired 60 shots. These were done in two courses of 30; each course consisted of two stages of 15; each stage consisted of three series of 5. In each stage, the time limit for each series was 8 seconds for the first, 6 seconds for the second, and 4 seconds for the third. 

A holdover from the previous Games was that full-body silhouettes, rather than round targets, continued to be used; however, scoring rings had been added so that now each shot was scored up to 10 rather than being strictly hit or miss. Ties for medals were broken with a shoot-off. The shoot-off was three series of 5 shots, each with a 4-second time limit.

One change from 1948–1956 was that hits were no longer the primary measurement of success. Ranking was now done by score, regardless of hits.

Records

Prior to the competition, the existing world and Olympic records were as follows.

The three medalists all matched the Olympic record at 587 points.

Schedule

Results

References

Shooting at the 1960 Summer Olympics
Men's 1960